Raymond Mommens (born 27 December 1958) is a former Belgian international footballer (position left winger or striker).

He is currently managing the Talents Detection Department at the R. Charleroi S.C.

Club career
As a player his club teams were Lokeren and Charleroi.

International career
He made his debut for the Belgium national football team during the qualifying rounds of the 1978 FIFA World Cup. He was included in the squads for the 1982 and 1986 World Cups, and the European Championships in 1980 and 1984.

Honours

Player

Lokeren 

 Belgian First Division: 1980–81 (runners-up)
 Belgian Cup: 1980–81 (runners-up)
 Bruges Matins: 1982

Charleroi 

Belgian Cup: 1992–93 (runners-up)

International 
Belgium

 UEFA European Championship: 1980 (runners-up)
 FIFA World Cup: 1986 (fourth place)
 Belgian Sports Merit Award: 1980

References

External links

Profile & stats - Lokeren

1958 births
Living people
Belgian footballers
Belgium international footballers
Belgian Pro League players
UEFA Euro 1980 players
1982 FIFA World Cup players
UEFA Euro 1984 players
1986 FIFA World Cup players
K.S.C. Lokeren Oost-Vlaanderen players
R. Charleroi S.C. players
Belgian football managers
R. Charleroi S.C. managers
Association football forwards
People from Lebbeke
Footballers from East Flanders